Bella Vista is a town and one of the 122 Municipalities of Chiapas, in southern Mexico. It covers an area of 114.3 km2 and borders Guatemala.

As of 2010, the municipality had a total population of 19,281, up from 18,205 as of 2005. Bella vista is 1of the 123 municipalities of Chiapas

As of 2010, the town of Bella Vista had a population of 1,672. Other than the town of Bella Vista, the municipality had 85 localities, the largest of which (with 2010 populations in parentheses) were: Las Chicharras (1,324), Emiliano Zapata (1,232), San José las Chicharras (1,080), La Rinconada (1,078), and Nuevo Pacayal (1,019), classified as rural.

References

Municipalities of Chiapas